The mouse lemurs are nocturnal lemurs of the genus Microcebus. Like all lemurs, mouse lemurs are native to Madagascar.

Lemurs and mouse lemurs were announced by the IUCN as the most endangered of all vertebrates. There were two known mouse lemur species in 1992; by 2016, there were 24. It was estimated that the 24 mouse lemur species evolved from a common ancestor 10 million years ago. Evolution of mouse lemurs is an example for adaptive radiation.

Mouse lemurs are omnivorous; their diets are diverse and include insect secretions, arthropods, small vertebrates, gum, fruit, flowers, nectar, and also leaves and buds depending on the season.

Mouse lemurs are considered cryptic species—with very little morphological differences between the various species, but with high genetic diversity. Recent evidence points to differences in their mating calls, which is very diverse. Since mouse lemurs are nocturnal, they might not have evolved to look differently, but had evolved various auditory and vocal systems.

Mouse lemurs have the smallest known brain of any primate, at just 0.004 pound (2 grams).

As written in Genetics, mouse lemurs help to provide a more extensive understanding of the biology, behavior, and health of primates.  Mouse lemurs are categorized as prosimian primates.  They are among the smallest and most rapidly developing primates and are becoming more abundant in Madagascar and around the world. These tiny creatures are helping to prove valuable information about the biology and evolution of primates through the analysis of their phenotypes and mutations, especially as a model organism for human medical research.

Reproduction and evolution
Mouse lemurs are also known for their sperm competition. During breeding seasons, the testicles of male mouse lemurs increase in size to about 130% of their normal size. This was speculated to increase the sperm production thereby conferring an advantage for the individual to bear more offspring. There are various hypotheses relating the rapid evolution of mouse lemur species to this sperm competition. In sexually inactive females the vulva is sealed, during the reproductive cycle the vulva is open. The vaginal morphology is also based on the time of day.  Analysis of the genomes of five different mouse lemur species revealed that Madagascar’s biogeography had been undergoing change before the arrival of humans.

Species
 Genus Microcebus: mouse lemurs
Arnhold's mouse lemur, M. arnholdi
 Madame Berthe's mouse lemur, M. berthae
 Bongolava mouse lemur M. bongolavensis
 Boraha mouse lemur M. boraha
 Danfoss' mouse lemur M. danfossi
 Ganzhorn's mouse lemur. M. ganzhorni
 Gerp's mouse lemur. M. gerpi
 Reddish-gray mouse lemur, M. griseorufus
 Jolly's mouse lemur, M. jollyae
 Jonah's mouse lemur, M. jonahi
 Goodman's mouse lemur, M. lehilahytsara
 MacArthur's mouse lemur, M. macarthurii
 Claire's mouse lemur, M. mamiratra, synonymous to M. lokobensis
 Bemanasy mouse lemur, M. manitatra
 Margot Marsh's mouse lemur, M. margotmarshae
 Marohita mouse lemur, M. marohita
 Mittermeier's mouse lemur, M. mittermeieri
 Gray mouse lemur, M. murinus
 Pygmy mouse lemur, M. myoxinus
 Golden-brown mouse lemur, M. ravelobensis
 Brown mouse lemur, M. rufus
 Sambirano mouse lemur, M. sambiranensis
 Simmons' mouse lemur, M. simmonsi
 Anosy mouse lemur. M. tanosi
 Northern rufous mouse lemur, M. tavaratra

References

External links
 
 Mouse lemur skeleton – Skeleton from the University of Texas at Austin
 BBC video clips and news articles